Hail!  (aka Hail to the Chief, Mr. President, Washington, B.C) is an American political comedy film directed 1970-1971 by Fred Levinson to a screenplay by Phil Dusenberry and Larry Spiegel. The film was screened 1972, but not released until 1973.

Plot
Made during the administration of President Richard Nixon, the movie follows a presidential adviser who learns that the Chief Executive is jailing and persecuting others who oppose his strict mandates.

Cast
 Dan Resin as The U.S. President
 Richard B. Shull as The Secretary of Health
 Dick O'Neill as The Attorney General 
 Joseph Sirola Reverend Jimmy Williams 
 Patricia Ripley as The First Lady
 Gary Sandy as Tom Goodman 
 Willard Waterman as Vice President

External links

References

1972 films
Films about fictional presidents of the United States